Juan José Gámez Rivera (8 July 1939 — 25 September 1997) was a Costa Rican football player and manager.

Club career
Nicknamed La Hormiguita Manuda, Gámez played with the juniors of Unión Deportiva Tibaseña and spent his entire senior career playing for Alajuelense, with whom he won 4 league titles. He played over 200 league matches for Liga and in 121 international matches.

International career
Gámez was capped by Costa Rica, playing 45 games and scoring 7 goals. He represented his country in 7 FIFA World Cup qualification matches.

Managerial career
After retiring, Gámez managed Alajuelense, Cartaginés and the Costa Rica national football team all on two occasions.

Personal life
A son of Juan Gámez Solano and Ernestina Rivera Montenegro, Gámez was married to Telly García Montiel and they had five children. He died in September 1997 of cardiac arrest.

References

External links
 

1939 births
1997 deaths
People from Puntarenas
Association football midfielders
Costa Rican footballers
Costa Rica international footballers
L.D. Alajuelense footballers
Costa Rican football managers
L.D. Alajuelense managers
Costa Rica national football team managers
Liga FPD players